Pendergrass may refer to:

Places
 Pendergrass, Georgia, a city in Georgia, United States

Surname

 Moses Pendergrass, subject of a footnote in a Mark Twain article
 Shane E. Pendergrass, politician
 Teddy Pendergrass (1950–2010), American singer

See also
Prendergast (surname)